An Olympic Park is the central sports complex of an Olympic Games (and that article includes a list of Olympic Parks).

Olympic Park or Olympic Park Stadium may also refer to:

Olympic parks and stadia called "Olympic Park"

Australia
 Olympic Park (Village), Heidelberg, Melbourne, built for the 1956 Olympics
 Olympic Park Stadium (Melbourne), built for the 1956 Olympics
 Sydney Olympic Park, New South Wales, developed for the 2000 Olympics and Paralympics
 Olympic Park railway line
 Olympic Park railway station, Sydney
 Sydney Olympic Park metro station
 Blacktown Olympic Park, near Sydney

Canada
 Canada Olympic Park, Calgary, Alberta, built for the 1988 Winter Olympics
 Olympic Park, Montreal built for the 1976 Olympics
 Whistler Olympic Park, British Columbia, built for the 2010 Winter Olympics

China

 Olympic Green, or Beijing Olympic Park, built for the 2008 Summer Olympics

Germany
 Olympiapark (Munich), built for the 1972 Olympics

Italy
 Torino Olympic Park, built for the 2006 Winter Olympics

Japan
Komazawa Olympic Park, Tokyo, built for the 1964 Olympics
Komazawa Olympic Park Stadium

Norway
 Olympic Park, the area around Stampesletta, Lillehammer, used in the 1994 Winter Olympics

Russia
 Sochi Olympic Park, built for the 2014 Winter Olympics and Winter Paralympics
 Imeretinsky Kurort railway station, formerly Olympic Park railway station, Sochi, Russia

South Korea
 Olympic Park, Seoul, built for the 1998 Olympics
 Olympic Park station (Seoul), Seoul
 Gangneung Olympic Park, PyeongChang, built for the 2018 Winter Olympics

United Kingdom
 Queen Elizabeth Olympic Park, London, built for the 2012 Olympics and Paralympics

United States
 Centennial Olympic Park, Atlanta, Georgia, built for the 1996 Olympics
 Utah Olympic Park, Salt Lake City, built for the 2002 Winter Olympics

Other places called "Olympic Park"
 Olympic Park (Buffalo), former baseball stadiums in Buffalo, New York, US
 Olympic National Park, on the Olympic Peninsula, Seattle, Washington, US
 Olympic Sculpture Park, Seattle, Washington, US
 Olympic Park Neighborhood Council, representing the Olympic Park neighborhood of Los Angeles, US
 Olympic Park (New Jersey), an amusement park which existed in the 19th and 20th centuries in New Jersey, US

See also

 Olympic (disambiguation)
 Park (disambiguation)
 Olympic Park railway station (disambiguation)